Hugo Rasmussen (22 March 1941 – 30 August 2015) was a Danish bassist. Rasmussen is best known for his album Sweets to the Sweet (1978). Sweets To the Sweet was re-released in 2001 on Danish label Music Mecca.

Biography
He worked with, among others, Teddy Wilson, Ralph Sutton Horace Parlan, Ben Webster, Dexter Gordon, Oliver Nelson, Tom Waits, Al Grey, Wild Bill Davison, Harry Sweets Edison, Doug Raney, Ole Kock Hansen, Svend Asmussen, and Jesper Thilo.
He was one of the most sought-after bass players in the world and performed on 800 albums.

Rasmussen was the acoustic bassist for Norbert Susemihl's New Orleans All Stars and for his own band, Hugo Rasmussen AllStarz which he formed in 1999 with Jakob Dinesen (tenor sax), Kasper Trandberg (cornet), Andrew Hyhne (trombone), Heine Hansen (piano) and Kresten Osgood (drums). He died at the age of 74 on 30 August 2015.

Awards
 2000 – Palæ Bars Jazzpris
 2002 – Ben Webster's Prize of Honour
 2006 – Bent Jædig Prisen
 2009 – IFPI Prize of Honour (Ærespris) Danish Music Award Jazz, award from the International Federation of the Phonographic Industry
 2014 – Dansk Musiker Forbund Prize of Honour
 2014 – Leo Mathisen Prize

Selected Discography

As leader 
 Sweets to the Sweet (1978) Re-released 2001 Music Mecca CD 3046-2 Denmark
 Hugo...Partly Live (2013) Stunt STUCD 13032

As sideman 
 The Jeep Is Jumping Ben Webster 1965 Released in 1991 Black Lion BLCD-760147
 Ben Webster Plays Ballads 1970 Membran
 Swiss Suite Oliver Nelson 1971 RCA
 Birdtown Birds Joe Albany 1973 SteepleChase
 Arrival Horace Parlan 1974 SteepleChase
 Motoring Along Al Cohn & Zoot Sims (Sonet, 1974)
Harry Sweets Edison – Eddie Lockjaw Davis & Richard Boone (1976) 1997 CD Storyville
Together Again Wild Bill Davison (1977) LP SLP Cat#:4027, 1998 (CD) Storyville Cat#:8216
 Introducing Doug Raney Doug Raney (1977) with Billy Hart 1994 CD Steeplechase
 The Ralph Sutton Quartet Ralph Sutton (1977) 1996 CD Storyville
 Al Grey and Jesper Thilo Quintet 1986 Storyville

References

External links 

 
 

1941 births
2015 deaths
Danish jazz double-bassists
Male double-bassists
Bebop double-bassists
People from Gladsaxe Municipality
Male jazz musicians